Casey C. Jones (June 14, 1915 – April 2, 2002) was an American professional basketball player, and later a member of the Ohio House of Representatives.

Basketball career
Jones attended Scott High School in Toledo, Ohio before attending Knoxville College, where he played for the basketball team. After graduating, he played for the Ciralsky Meat Packers, a barnstorming steam, before signing a contract to play for the Toledo Jim White Chevrolets in 1942–43. The Toledo Jim White Chevrolets were in the National Basketball League (NBL), a forerunner to the modern National Basketball Association. Jones was one of the first 10 African-American players in the NBL's history. After his time in the NBL, Jones played for two more barnstorming teams, the New York Komedy Kings and the Harlem Globetrotters.

References

1915 births
2002 deaths
20th-century American politicians
American men's basketball players
Basketball players from Ohio
Guards (basketball)
Harlem Globetrotters players
Knoxville Bulldogs men's basketball players
Members of the Ohio House of Representatives
Sportspeople from Toledo, Ohio
Toledo Jim White Chevrolets players